Zvyozdnaya is a station on the Moskovsko-Petrogradskaya Line of the Saint Petersburg Metro. It was opened on December 25, 1972. It was designed by K.N. Afonskya, A.C. Getskin and V.P. Shuvalova. In the original blueprints, the station was called "Imeni Lensoveta" (Soviet of Leningrad Honorary station).

Location
The station is adjacent to Krylov State Research Center.

Transit Connections 
 Tramway - Route 29
 Municipal Bus - Routes 34, 50, 59, 64, 64А, 116, 179, 192, 128
 Marshrutka - К-86, К-138, К-116, К-151, К-201, К-293, К-292, К-293а, К-296, К-296а, К-350, К-363, К-479, К-610, К-610а

Saint Petersburg Metro stations
Railway stations in Russia opened in 1972
1972 establishments in the Soviet Union
Railway stations located underground in Russia